The Morocco women's national football team represents Morocco in international women's football and is controlled by the Royal Moroccan Football Federation. The team played its first international match in 1998, as part of the third Women's Africa Cup of Nations.

The traditional rivals of Morocco are mainly Algeria, Tunisia and Egypt.

History 
After being given a walkover following Kenya's withdrawal from the 1998 Championship, the team made it to the finals in Nigeria, where they lost 0–8 to the hosts before beating Egypt 4–1. Morocco met fellow Women's African Football Championship debutants Democratic Republic of the Congo in the final group game, with both teams having the chance to qualify for the semi-finals with a win. However, the eventual 0–0 draw sent Morocco out, as Congo qualified on better goal difference.

Two years later, Morocco qualified for the African Championship in South Africa with a 6–1 aggregate victory over Algeria. However, after the team scored the first goal against Cameroon in the opening group stage match, they went on to concede 13 goals, lose all three matches, and finish last in the group.

Their 2002 and 2006 campaigns were both stopped by Mali in the qualifying stages. Morocco had been seeded into the second qualifying round, but two goalless draws in Bamako and Rabat sent the tie into a penalty shoot-out which Mali won 5–4. In 2004, Morocco did not enter, while a 1–6 aggregate defeat to Mali sent them out of the 2006 African Championship and the 2007 World Cup.

New era (2020–present) 
On 22 February 2020, Morocco lionesses managed to win the 2020 UNAF Women's Cup after defeating Algeria 2-0 to top the final standings.

After hiatus and lack of achievement, the Women's AFCON was expanded to 12 teams, starting from 2020, but due to COVID-19 pandemic, the first edition was held in Morocco 2022 instead. Using this home advantage, Morocco restarted its women's football structure, rebuilt its women's team that has long been neglected. With greater interest, Morocco was able to create history by reaching the semi-finals in their home soil. With this achievement, Morocco made a historic chapter as the first Arab country to qualify for the FIFA Women's World Cup, when the country is set to debut in 2023. Morocco went on to make another historic chapter as the first North African and Arab country to participate in the final of a continental tournament by beating African powerhouse and three-times defending champions Nigeria on penalties. However, Morocco could not finish its dream in the final after losing to an experienced South African side, whose two goals crushed the Moroccan dream to win the title.

Team image

Nicknames 
The Morocco women's national football team has been known or nicknamed as the "Atlas Lionesses".

Home stadium 

Morocco play their home matches at Prince Moulay Abdellah Stadium, a facility of the Royal Moroccan Football Federation. The stadium is also the home of AS FAR and hosts several matches of the men's team. It is located in Rabat, Morocco.

Kits and crest

Kit suppliers

Results and fixtures 

The following is a list of match results in the last 12 months, as well as any future matches that have been scheduled.

Legend

2022

2023 

Morocco Results and Fixtures – Soccerway.com
globalsportsarchive

Coaching staff

Current coaching staff

Manager history 

 Kelly Lindsey (2020)
 Reynald Pedros (2020–)

Players

Current squad 
Caps and goals accurate up to and including 22 April 2021.

Recent call-ups 
The following players have been called up to the squad in the past 12 months.

Previous squads 
Africa Women Cup of Nations
2000 African Women's Championship squad
2022 Africa Women Cup of Nations squad
UNAF Women's Tournament
2020 UNAF Women's Tournament squad
Malta International Women's Football Tournament
2022 Malta International Women's Football Tournament squads

Records 

*Active players in bold, statistics correct as of 23 July 2022.

Most capped players

Top goalscorers

Competitive record

FIFA Women's World Cup 

*Draws include knockout matches decided on penalty kicks.

Olympic Games

Africa Women Cup of Nations 

*Draws include knockout matches decided on penalty kicks.

African Games 

2019 edition of the football tournament was played by the U-20 team.

Arab Women's Cup 
Morocco lost to Algeria in the championship game of the first Arab Women's Cup in 2006 after defeating host Egypt 4–2 in the semi-finals.

UNAF Women's Tournament

Honours

Continental 
Women's Africa Cup of Nations
  Runners-up: (1) 2022

Regional 
UNAF Women's Tournament
 Champions: (1) 2020
Arab Women's Championship
 Runners-up: (1) 2006

Under-20 team 
African Games
 Bronze Medal: (1) 2019

International 
 Malta International Football Tournament 
 Champions: (1) 2022

All−time record against FIFA recognized nations 
The list shown below shows the Morocco national football team all−time international record against opposing nations.
*As of xxxxxx after match against xxxx.
Key

Record per opponent 
*As of25 July 2022 after match against  .
Key

The following table shows Sudan's all-time official international record per opponent:

See also 

Sport in Morocco
Football in Morocco
Women's football in Morocco
Morocco women's national under-17 football team
Morocco women's national under-20 football team
Cultural significance of the Atlas lion
Morocco national football team
Morocco A' national football team
Morocco national under-23 football team
Morocco national under-20 football team
Morocco national under-17 football team

Other football codes 
Morocco national futsal team
Morocco national beach soccer team

References 
Notes

Citations

External links 
Official website only 
Morocco profile at FIFA.com

 
African women's national association football teams